The River Meon is a chalk stream in Hampshire in the south of England. It rises at East Meon then flows  in a generally southerly direction to empty into the Solent at Hill Head near Stubbington. Above Wickham, the river runs through the South Downs National Park.

Course
The River Meon rises one mile (1.6 km) south of the village centre of East Meon. It flows due north, then northwest to West Meon, and southwest to Warnford followed by its characteristic, quite straight, south-southwest course, with many tiny wobbles in short stretches. The river descends through the villages of Exton, Corhampton and Meonstoke, Droxford, Wickham, and Titchfield. Overall the valley forms the shape of that of a shepherd's crook.

Navigation
Above the estuary has never been navigable. Titchfield Haven, on the Solent coast was a minor harbour. In the 17th century, the Earl of Southampton caused a sluice (not a canal) to be built (Titchfield Canal) to drain the marshes. The reinstated wetlands form the Titchfield Haven National Nature Reserve.

Water quality
The Environment Agency measures the water quality of the river systems in England. Each is given an overall ecological status, which may be one of five levels: high, good, moderate, poor and bad. There are several components that are used to determine this, including biological status, which looks at the quantity and varieties of invertebrates, angiosperms and fish. Chemical status, which compares the concentrations of various chemicals against known safe concentrations, is rated good or fail.

Water quality of the River Meon in 2019:

Gallery

See also
 Meonwara - The people who lived in the Meon Valley during the Anglo-Saxon period.

References

External links
 Ordnance Survey National Grid:  (source),  (mouth)
 Current flood status for River Meon, from the Environment Agency

Meon, River